Kirkby Fleetham with Fencote is a civil parish in the Hambleton District of North Yorkshire, England. At the 2011 census, the population was 560 which included the hamlets of Ainderby Mires and Holtby.

References

Civil parishes in North Yorkshire